Cruciferin is one of the two most abundant seed storage proteins in mustard and rapeseed (Brassica napus L., Brassica juncea L. Czern., Brassica nigra L. W.D.J.Koch, Brassica rapa L. and Sinapis alba L.). They are classified as 11S globulins based on their sedimentation coefficient, and are salt soluble neutral glycoproteins. Their molecular weights range from 20 to 40 kDa. They comprise up to 50–70% of the total seed protein. Cruciferin is a comparatively larger seed storage protein than napin. It is composed of two polypeptide chains α and β. The α-chain has a mass of 30 kDa and the β-chain weighs in at 20 kDa. They are held together by a disulphide bond.

References

Seed storage proteins